Voldsminde was a tram stop on the Lade Line of the Trondheim Tramway. It was operational between 1936 and 1988 and was the site of a tram depot from 1913. Between 1936 and 1958 it was the terminus of the line to Lademoen.

History
In 1913 the tram line to Lademoen was extended to Voldsminde and a new depot was built at the terminus.

In 1936 a loop was constructed at Voldsminde, extending the terminal station about a block.

After the tram to Lade was abandoned in 1988, the 11 brand new trams were stored at the depot at Voldsminde because the depot is located next to the Nordland Line.

After the trams were relocated to Gråkallbanen, the depot was converted to a skateboard park.

Trondheim Tramway stations